Great South Pond is a  reservoir in Plymouth, Massachusetts, in South Pond village. The pond is within the Eel River watershed, located southeast of Little South Pond, west of South Triangle Pond, and north of Boot Pond. The pond serves as a secondary municipal water supply for the Town of Plymouth.

External links
Environmental Protection Agency
South Shore Coastal Watersheds - Lake Assessments

Ponds of Plymouth, Massachusetts
Ponds of Massachusetts